Simončič Hayrack, also Simončič Toplar, is a hayrack at the southeastern border of Bistrica in the Municipality of Šentrupert in the traditional region of Lower Carniola. It has been known as the largest and the most beautiful hayrack in Slovenia. It was built in 1936 by Janko Gregorčič (officially Janez Gregorčič; 1906–1984), a carpenter from the nearby Slovenska Vas, on the order of the farmer Jože Simončič. It has been designed as a double hayrack (toplar) with wooden pillars, three pairs of windows and a pitched roof. The gable, which is turned towards the road linking the villages of Mirna and Mokronog, is richly decorated with predominantly plant motives. Simončič Hayrack belongs to the farmstead Bistrica no. 11. Since 2001, it has been protected as a cultural monument of national significance and is the only hayrack in Slovenia with this status. As the most known of over 500 hayracks in the Mirna Valley it supplements the Land of Hayracks, i.e. the museum of hayracks in Šentrupert. Exhibitions of visual arts and other events take place seasonally under its roof, however it is also still used to dry hay and as a place to store agricultural machines.

References

External links

Hayracks
Municipality of Šentrupert
Buildings and structures completed in 1936
Cultural monuments of Slovenia
20th-century architecture in Slovenia